Levitt is an English variant Anglo-Norman surname or an Ashkenazi Jewish surname,  and can refer to:

People

In arts and entertainment
Alan "Al" Levitt (1932–1994), American jazz drummer
Alfred Levitt (1894–2000), Russian–American painter and art historian
Andrew Levitt (1970), American drag queen 
Alfred Lewis Levitt (1916–2002), American screenwriter blacklisted in the 1950s
Gene Levitt (1920–1991), American film director
Helen Levitt (1913–2009), American photographer
Helen Slote Levitt (1916–1993), American screenwriter
Igor Levit (born 1987) Russian-German pianist
Joseph Gordon-Levitt (b. 1981), American actor
Saul Levitt  (1911–1977), American playwright 
Steve Levitt, American actor

In science and academia
Herschel Levit (1912–1986), American artist, designer, professor 
Malcolm Harris Levitt (b. 1957), British physical chemist, professor of physical chemistry at the University of Southampton, UK. Nuclear magnetic resonance (NMR) spectroscopist. 
Michael Levitt (b. 1947), British biophysicist, professor of structural biology at Stanford University, California, and one of the founders of modern computational biology
Norman Levitt (1943–2009), American mathematician
Peggy Levitt (?), American sociologist
Steven Levitt (b. 1967), American economist, author of Freakonomics
Theodore Levitt (1925–2006), American business theorist; coined the term "marketing myopia"
Toby Levitt (1908–1958), South African-born endocrinologist and author of a standard textbook on the thyroid

In other fields
Arthur Levitt (b. 1931), former chairman of the U.S. Securities and Exchange Commission
Chad Levitt (b. 1975), American NFL football player
Dorothy Levitt (1882–1922), English female racing driver
Tom Levitt (b. 1954), British politician
William Levitt (1907–1994), American real-estate developer, namesake of the Levittowns

References

See also
 Levitt & Sons
 Leavitt (disambiguation)

Surnames
Jewish surnames
Levite surnames
Yiddish-language surnames

ru:Левит (фамилия)